Last Island (Official name: Isle Dernière, often misspelled as Îsle Dernière, Isle Dernier, L'Îsle Dernière, Île Dernière, etc.) was a barrier island and location of a pleasure resort southwest of New Orleans on the Gulf Coast of Louisiana, United States. Located south of Dulac, Louisiana, between Lake Pelto, Caillou Bay, and the Gulf of Mexico, it was named Last Island because it was the last of a series of barrier islands which stretched westward from the mouth of the Mississippi River, 90 miles to the east.

The island was destroyed by the Last Island Hurricane of August 10, 1856, which split it in two.  Afterwards, it became known in the plural Isles Dernières ("Last Islands"). 

The island was originally approximately 25 miles in length before being split in half by the storm.  Subsequent tropical storms did more damage, and Isle Dernière was further fragmented into smaller islands.  Now the Isles Dermieres Barrier Island Refuge, since the 1990s there have been a number of different projects aimed at rebuilding and protecting the islands, including in 1998, when sand was suctioned up to raise the level of the islands, and plantings were made to keep the new land in place.

The closest village to the islands is Cocodrie, about 15 miles to the northeast.

Lighthouse
The Louisiana legislature petitioned the U.S. Congress in 1848 for a lighthouse for the island, and money was appropriated for a lightship, which would be placed on Ship Shoal, several miles southeast of the island.  The revenue cutter McLane was converted at the cost of $12,774.67 into the lightship Pleasonton – named after Stephen Pleasonton, the auditor of the Treasury, who oversaw federal lighthouses in the United States. It was put into service on December 29, 1849, but was replaced in 1860 by a permanent lighthouse of the iron skeletal tower type.  The Ship Shoal Lighthouse was discontinued and abandoned in 1965.

Resort at Last Island

Before the Last Island Hurricane, the island was a popular resort where people could enjoy white sand beaches and clearer water, which are not found on the marshy mainland.  Last Island was also known for an almost continuous breeze, which would have been welcomed by those escaping the suffocating heat of New Orleans.  Accommodations included the John Muggah's Ocean House Hotel, and for entertainment there were several gambling establishments and the Captain Dave Muggah's Billiard House.  Several hundred yards to the west of the hotel was the settlement known as Last Island Village which consisted of approximately 100 beach homes, some "fine" houses and other temporary summer houses. 

Regular steamer service to the island was provided by the Star from Bayou Boeuf.  The New Orleans, Opelousas and Great Western Railroad provided a connection to Bayou Boeuf from Algiers, La., a short ride on the Algiers Train Ferry across the Mississippi River from the French Quarter landing at St. Ann Street.  Regular railroad fare was $3.50 with half-fare for children and servants. New Orleanians could take the Algiers passenger ferry.

Of the approximately 400 vacationers on the island at the time the hurricane hit it, 198 were known or presumed dead and 203 were known survivors. Several of the victims were enslaved people, some of whom were credited with rescuing others, including several children. Every structure on the island including the hotel, a large, two-story wooden structure of considerable strength, was destroyed, and the island was left void of crops and other vegetation.

Isles Dernieres Barrier Island Refuge
The Isles Dernieres Barrier Islands Refuge encompasses four islands: from east to west, Wine, Trinity/East, Whiskey, and Raccoon, as well as several thousand acres of associated water.  There is a public use area for bird-watching, picnicking, fishing, and overnight camping on Trinity Island; any other use of the islands requires a permit from the Louisiana Department of Wildlife and Fisheries, which owns the islands and has managed them since 1992, when they were initially leased from the Louisiana Land and Exploration Company.  Today, the islands protect the mainland to the north from erosion and damage from hurricanes, but their primary purpose is to provide protected habitat for nesting waterbirds, such as pelicans.  Raccoon Island in particular is one of the most important waterbird nesting areas on the Louisiana Gulf Coast.

References
Notes

Bibliography

 NOTE:  The book title is incorrectly indexed in Google books

 Sallenger, Abby (2009) Island in a Storm: A Rising Sea, a Vanishing Coast, and a Nineteenth-Century Disaster that Warns of a Warmer World. New York: Public Affairs , 

History of Louisiana
Landforms of Terrebonne Parish, Louisiana
Barrier islands of Louisiana